The Ministry of Local Government and Rural Development is a Ministry of the Government of Sierra Leone.

 the current of Minister for Local Government and Rural Development is Tamba Lamina.

References

Government of Sierra Leone